Campsicnemus loripes is a species of fly in the family Dolichopodidae. It is distributed in Europe.

References

Sympycninae
Insects described in 1832
Diptera of Europe
Taxa named by Alexander Henry Haliday